Rivky Deython Mokodompit (born on 5 December 1988) is an Indonesian professional footballer who plays as a goalkeeper for Liga 1 club PSM Makassar.

Honours

Club honors
Sriwijaya
 Indonesia Super League: 2011–12
 Indonesian Inter Island Cup: 2012
Mitra Kukar
 General Sudirman Cup: 2015
PSM Makassar
 Piala Indonesia: 2019
Persebaya Surabaya
 East Java Governor Cup: 2020
Dewa United
 Liga 2 third place (play-offs): 2021

References

External links
 Rivky Mokodompit at Soccerway
 Rivky Mokodompit at Liga Indonesia

Living people
1988 births
People from Kotamobagu
Persibom Bolaang Mongondow players
Persita Tangerang players
Persitara Jakarta Utara players
Sriwijaya F.C. players
Persisam Putra Samarinda players
Mitra Kukar players
Persebaya Surabaya players
PSM Makassar players
Semen Padang F.C. players
Dewa United F.C. players
Liga 1 (Indonesia) players
Liga 2 (Indonesia) players
Association football goalkeepers
Indonesia youth international footballers
Sportspeople from North Sulawesi
Indonesian footballers